General Hardy may refer to:

Campbell Hardy (1906–1984), Royal Marines general
Hugh W. Hardy (1924–2003), U.S. Marine Corps Reserves major general
Jean Hardy (1762–1802), French Royal Army brigadier general
John Spencer Hardy (1913–2012), U.S. Army lieutenant general